Rudger Clawson (March 12, 1857 – June 21, 1943) was a member of the Quorum of the Twelve Apostles of the Church of Jesus Christ of Latter-day Saints (LDS Church) from 1898 until his death in 1943. He also served as President of the Quorum of the Twelve Apostles from 1921 until his death. For five days in 1901 he was a member of the First Presidency of the LDS Church.

Biography

Clawson was born in Salt Lake City, Utah Territory, to Hiram Bradley Clawson and Margaret Judd of Canada.

While serving his mission in Georgia, he faced many challenges, not the least of which was the mounting anti-Mormonism in that sector. On July 21, 1879, Clawson and his missionary companion were standing at  Varnell Station, Georgia, when they were surrounded by an angry mob of anti-Mormons. One of the mobbers shot and killed his companion, Joseph Standing. One of the mobbers then turned and pointed to Clawson, and said, "Shoot that man!" Clawson coolly faced the mob and folded his arms. He exclaimed, "Shoot!" The mob soon dispersed in the face of Clawson's defiance and willingness to face the mob. He brought the body of his deceased missionary companion back to Salt Lake City, where a public funeral was held in the Tabernacle. Clawson became somewhat of a celebrity for his bravery that day.

August 1882 was a difficult time for Clawson, as he became the first practicing polygamist to be convicted and serve a sentence after the passage of the Edmunds Act. During the trial, one of his wives refused to testify against him. She was put in prison for contempt of court. Judge Charles S. Zane sentenced Clawson to the maximum possible penalty—he was punished with 3 years in prison and a $1500 fine. For his final words before being sent to prison, Clawson defended his right to practice his religion and challenged the court's ability to enforce a law aimed at destroying a particular establishment of religion in violation of the First Amendment to the United States Constitution. His appeal was heard and rejected by the Supreme Court of the United States in Clawson v. United States. Clawson was pardoned in 1887 by President Grover Cleveland mere months before his sentence was to expire.

Clawson was ordained an apostle and member of the Quorum of the Twelve Apostles on October 10, 1898. He was asked to serve as second counselor in the First Presidency under church president Lorenzo Snow on October 6, 1901, but Snow died just four days later.

In 1904, the town of Kingsville, Emery County, Utah, was renamed Clawson in his honor after he visited the town to organize a ward.

That same year, Clawson secretly contracted a plural marriage with Pearl Udall, daughter of David King Udall and Eliza Stewart Udall. Because they married after then-church president Joseph F. Smith issued a manifesto expressly prohibiting plural marriage among Latter-day Saints, their relationship was a "clandestine marriage of secret meetings and long absences", and they never shared a home. After discussing their marriage across several rendezvous held in the three-month span of October 1912 to January 1913, Clawson "released her [Pearl Udall] from the marriage", and they ceased to live as spouses. Pearl Udall later married Joseph Nelson on September 17, 1919.

In 1921, Clawson became the President of the Quorum of the Twelve Apostles. He served in this position for 22 years, the second-longest tenure for this position in the history of the LDS Church.

Death
Clawson died from pneumonia at the age of 86 in Salt Lake City. He had served in the quorum for a total of 45 years. He was buried at Salt Lake City Cemetery.

See also
 The Church of Jesus Christ of Latter-day Saints in Georgia (U.S. state)
 List of people pardoned or granted clemency by the president of the United States
 Phrenology and the Latter Day Saint Movement

Published works

Notes

References

External resources
 Grampa Bill's GA Pages: Rudger Clawson

1857 births
1943 deaths
19th-century Mormon missionaries
American Mormon missionaries in the United States
American people convicted of bigamy
American prisoners and detainees
Apostles (LDS Church)
Burials at Salt Lake City Cemetery
Counselors in the First Presidency (LDS Church)
Deaths from pneumonia in Utah
Lynching survivors in the United States
People from Salt Lake City
Presidents of the Quorum of the Twelve Apostles (LDS Church)
Prisoners and detainees of the United States federal government
Recipients of American presidential pardons
American general authorities (LDS Church)
Latter Day Saints from Utah